Scorched earth is the military strategy or operational policy of destroying everything useful to the enemy in areas that cannot be defended.

Scorched Earth may also refer to:

Books
Scorched Earth: Australia’s Secret Plan for Total War a 2017 book by Sue Rosen
Scorched Earth, a 2013 novel, the seventh and final book in the Henderson's Boys series by Robert Muchamore

Games
Scorched Earth (video game), a 1991 artillery game for IBM PC compatibles
"Scorched Earth", a DLC for the survival game Ark: Survival Evolved

Films and television
Scorched Earth (1969 film), a Norwegian drama film
Scorched Earth (2018 film), a Canadian sci-fi film
"Scorched Earth", a 2000 episode of the fourth season of Stargate SG-1
Scorched Earth (Law & Order: Special Victims Unit), a 2011 episode of Law & Order: Special Victims Unit

Music
"Scorched Earth", a song from Avatar: Music from the Motion Picture
"Scorched Earth", a song by Van der Graaf Generator from the album Godbluff

Other
Operation Scorched Earth, a Saudi military operation in the north of Yemen
Scorched Earth, a board wargame in the Europa series by Game Designers' Workshop
Scorched-earth defense, a form of risk arbitrage and anti-takeover strategy
Scorched-Earth Policy, an American heavy metal band
Scorching the Earth, a tactic in British Parliamentary Debating